Nembo was the name of at least two ships of the Italian Navy and may refer to:

 , a  launched in 1901 and sunk in 1916
 , a  launched in 1927 and sunk in 1940

Italian Navy ship names